"You're My Best Friend" is a song by the British rock band Queen, written by the band's bass player, John Deacon, who wrote it for and about his wife. It was first included on the 1975 album A Night at the Opera, and later released as a single. The ballad also appeared on the Live Killers (1979) live album, and on the compilation albums Greatest Hits (1981), Absolute Greatest (2009) and Queen Forever (2014).

The song reached number seven in the UK Singles Chart and number 16 on the US Billboard Hot 100. It is certified platinum by the RIAA in the US with over one million copies sold. The song has since featured in television, film, and other media, such as The Simpsons and Family Guy.

History
Deacon wrote the song for his wife, Veronica Tetzlaff. In this song, he plays a Wurlitzer electric piano in addition to his bass guitar work. The characteristic "bark" of the Wurlitzer's bass notes plays a prominent role in the song. During live performances, a Grand Piano was used rather than an electric, and it would be played by Freddie Mercury, while Deacon played the bass guitar just like in the original recording. The song would be performed live by the band from the Summer Gigs 1976 Tour up to the end of the North American leg of The Game Tour in 1980. It was then dropped from the rest of the tour, and would not be played live again until after the death of Mercury.

The song was used in several TV shows and films such as Hot in Cleveland, Will & Grace, EastEnders, My Name is Earl, The King of Queens, Good Omens, The Break-Up, the end credits of I Now Pronounce You Chuck and Larry, The Simpsons, Shaun of the Dead, Peter's Friends, The Secret Life of Pets, and the Family Guy episode "Farmer Guy".

Music video
The music video, directed by Bruce Gowers, shows the band in a huge ballroom surrounded by over one thousand candles, including a huge chandelier hung from the ceiling. The video was filmed in April 1976  at Elstree Studios, near London. Additionally, Deacon is seen playing a grand piano rather than the Wurlitzer he used on the recording.

Composition

The song was composed by John Deacon in the key of C major with a meter of 4/4, in swing feel.

The album A Night at the Opera features songs of numerous styles, including this three-minute pop song. Very unusual for the genre, there is no section appearing more than twice; characteristic of many Queen songs, as affirmed by Brian May. On the other hand, in terms of phrases and measures, there are numerous repetitions or variants. The form is cyclic and very similar to that of "Spread Your Wings" (1977). Another similarity between the two songs is the lack of (real) modulation. The arrangement features 3 and 4-part vocal and guitar harmonies, bass (melodic approach), drums, and electric piano. This is Deacon's second recorded song and the first one released on single, some six months after the album-release. Mercury hits two sustained C5s in the lead vocal track.

Reception
Cash Box said that "the harmonies are smoothly designed to accentuate the hook of the chorus" and that "the beat is really good, on the edge of bubblegum, but still classy."  Record World said it "stands to be every bit the enormous hit ['Bohemian Rhapsody'] was," even though it doesn't break new ground the way "Bohemian Rhapsody" did. Classic Rock History critic Millie Zeiler rated it John Deacon's best Queen song.

Charts

Weekly charts

Year-end charts

Certifications

Personnel
Information is taken from the Queen Songs website
Freddie Mercury – lead and backing vocals
Brian May – electric guitars, backing vocals
Roger Taylor – drums, backing vocals
John Deacon – Wurlitzer electric piano, bass guitar

References

External links
 Lyrics at Queen official website
 

Queen (band) songs
1976 singles
Songs written by John Deacon
Music videos directed by Bruce Gowers
Song recordings produced by Roy Thomas Baker
EMI Records singles
Elektra Records singles
Hollywood Records singles
Songs about friendship
1975 songs
Pop ballads
British pop songs
1970s ballads